Pontinha station is part of the Blue Line of the Lisbon Metro and is located in the Bairro Mário Madeira neighbourhood of Lisbon, near the border with Amadora and Odivelas.

History
The station opened on October 18, 1997, in conjunction with the Carnide station, and it is located on Estrada Militar da Pontinha from which it takes its name. Built over it is an important bus terminal.

The architectural design of the station is by Ana Nascimento.

Connections

Urban Buses

Carris 
 724 Alcântara - Calçada da Tapada ⇄ Pontinha
 726 Sapadores ⇄ Pontinha Centro
 729 Bairro Padre Cruz ⇄ Algés
 747 Campo Grande (Metro) ⇄ Pontinha (Metro)
 768 Cidade Universitária ⇄ Quinta dos Alcoutins

Suburban Buses

Rodoviária de Lisboa 
 203 Pontinha (Metro) ⇄ Casal do Bispo
 205 Pontinha (Metro) ⇄ Sr Roubado (Metro) via Serra da Luz
 206 Pontinha (Metro) ⇄ Loures (Centro Comercial)
 210 Lisboa (Colégio Militar) ⇄ Caneças (Jardim)
 222 Pontinha (Metro) ⇄ Pedernais (Bairro do Girasol)
 223 Pontinha (Metro) ⇄ Casal Novo
 224 Pontinha (Metro) ⇄ Caneças (Esc Secundária) via Serra da Helena
 227 Pontinha (Metro) ⇄ Vale Grande
 228 Pontinha (Metro) ⇄ Jardim da Amoreira
 231 Pontinha (Metro) ⇄ Caneças (Qta São Carlos) via Centro Comercial
 236 Pontinha (Metro) ⇄ Casal Novo via Casal do Bispo
 905 Pontinha (Metro) ⇄ Odivelas (Metro) via Serra da Luz
 931 Lisboa (Campo Grande) ⇄ Pontinha (Metro) via Centro Comercial

Vimeca / Lisboa Transportes 
 128 Casal da Mira (Dolce Vita Tejo) ⇄ Lisboa (Colégio Militar)
 143 Amadora (Estação Norte) ⇄ Pontinha (Estação)
 155 Amadora (Hospital) - Circulação

See also
 List of Lisbon metro stations

References

External links

Blue Line (Lisbon Metro) stations
Railway stations opened in 1997